CBOL may refer to:
 the Chinese Bible Online in CBOL project by faith hope love 
 the Radio station CBQT-FM
 the Consortium for the Barcode of Life